Antonio Oliver  (Cartagena, January 29, 1903 - July 28, 1968) was a Spanish writer, poet, literary critic and historian of Spanish art. He was also a part of the Generation of '27, a group of artists and poets that specialized in the avant-garde.

Work
Mast, 1925
Saved Crying
Andrew Knight Talks
Book of Loas, 1947
From Cervantes to Poetry, 1944
Don Luis de Gongora, 1963
Life and Work of Lope de Vega
Garcilaso de la Vega, 1965
Garcilaso, Captain and Poet
Dying but no fear
This other Rubén Darío
1900-1950. Half a Century of Artists Murcianos, 1952

Spanish literary critics
20th-century Spanish historians
1903 births
1968 deaths
20th-century Spanish poets
Spanish male poets
Writers from Cartagena, Spain
20th-century Spanish male writers